Argentina competed at the 2014 Summer Youth Olympics, in Nanjing, China from 16 August to 28 August 2014.

Medalists
Medals awarded to participants of mixed-NOC (Combined) teams are represented in italics. These medals are not counted towards the individual NOC medal tally.

Archery

Argentina qualified a male archer from its performance at the 2013 World Archery Youth Championships.

Individual

Team

Athletics

Argentina qualified 3 athletes in the following events:

Qualification Legend: Q=Final A (medal); qB=Final B (non-medal); qC=Final C (non-medal); qD=Final D (non-medal); qE=Final E (non-medal)

Boys
Track & road events

Field Events

Girls
Track & road events

Basketball

Argentina qualified a boys' team from their performance at the 2013 U18 3x3 World Championships.

Boys' Tournament

Roster
 Michel Divoy
 Rodrigo Gerhardt
 Juan Pablo Lugrin
 José Vildoza

Group Stage

Knockout Stage

Beach Volleyball

Argentina qualified a boys' and girls' team from their performance at the 2014 CSV Youth Beach Volleyball Tour.

Boxing

Argentina qualified one boxer based on its performance at the 2014 AIBA Youth World Championships

Boys

Cycling

Argentina qualified a boys' and girls' team based on its ranking issued by the UCI.

Team

Mixed Relay

Equestrian

Argentina qualified one athlete at the 2013 Equestrian South American Junior Championships.

Fencing

Argentina qualified one athlete based on its performance at the 2014 Cadet World Championships.

Boys

Mixed Team

Field Hockey

Argentina qualified a girls' team based on its performance at the 2014 Youth American Championship.

Girls' Tournament

Roster

 Cristina Cosentino
 Bárbara Dichiara Gentili
 Julieta Jankunas
 Macarena Losada
 María Paula Ortiz
 Micaela Retegui
 Delfina Thome
 Sofía Toccalino
 Eugenia Trinchinetti

Group Stage

Quarterfinal

Semifinal

Bronze medal match

Golf

Argentina qualified one athlete based on the 8 June 2014 IGF World Amateur Golf Rankings.

Individual

Team

Gymnastics

Artistic Gymnastics

Argentina qualified one athlete based on its performance at the 2014 Junior Pan American Artistic Gymnastics Championships.

Girls

Judo

Argentina qualified two athletes based on its performance at the 2013 Cadet World Judo Championships.

Individual

Team

Modern Pentathlon

Argentina qualified one athlete based on the 1 June 2014 Olympic Youth A Pentathlon World Rankings.

Rowing

Argentina qualified two boats based on its performance at the 2014 Latin American Qualification Regatta.

Rugby sevens

Argentina qualified 1 team in the boys' team competition based on their ranking at the 2013 Rugby Sevens World Cup.

Boys' Tournament

Roster

 José Barros Sosa
 Lautaro Bazán Vélez
 Vicente Boronat
 Enrique Camerlinckx
 Juan Cruz Camerlinckx
 Juan Ignacio Conil Vila
 Manuel de Sousa Carrusca
 Bautista Delguy
 Indalecio Ledesma
 Hugo Miotti
 Mariano Romanini
 Isaac Sprenger

Group Stage

Semifinal

Gold Medal Match

Sailing

Argentina qualified two boats based on its performance at the Techno 293 Central & South American Continental Qualifiers.

Shooting

Argentina qualified two shooters based on its performance at the Americas Qualification Event held during a Shooting World Cup event in Fort Benning.

Lucas Decicilia finished 1st in Men's 10m Air Rifle event, thus winning one quota for Argentina. Fernanda Russo while ending 4th at the Girls 10m Air Rifle event still gained the quota because Mexico had already occupied it's quotas by finishing 1st, 2nd and 3rd in the Girl's Air Rifle Event (the requirement to get a quota was to end 1st or 2nd in a MQA event).

Individual

Team

Swimming

Argentina qualified three swimmers.

Boys

Girls

Table Tennis

Argentina qualified one athlete based on its performance at the Latin American Qualification Event.

Singles

Team

Qualification Legend: Q=Main Bracket (medal); qB=Consolation Bracket (non-medal)

Taekwondo

Argentina qualified one athlete based on its performance at the Taekwondo Qualification Tournament.

Boys

Tennis 

Argentina qualified two tennis players based on their ranking.

Singles

Doubles

Weightlifting

Argentina was given a reallocation spot for being a top ranked nation not yet qualified.

Girls

Wrestling

Argentina qualified one athlete based on its performance at the 2014 Pan American Cadet Championships.

Boys

References

2014 in Argentine sport
Nations at the 2014 Summer Youth Olympics
Argentina at the Youth Olympics